Route 575 was a bus route which ran between Harlow and Romford.

History 
The route was introduced on 3 November 2008 by Blue Triangle. The route was withdrawn after 27 August 2021, with then-operator Go-Ahead London citing a decline in usage as a reason for withdrawal.

Route 
The route ran during weekdays, and from 2013 to 2017, also on Saturdays. Up until 2013, the route ran to Lakeside Shopping Centre. The route had sometimes been extended to Southend on Saturdays. Prior to withdrawal, only one return journey ran per day between Harlow and Romford.

References 

Bus routes in England